Ihor Mykolayovych Medynskyi (born 3 January 1993) is a Ukrainian professional footballer who plays as a right winger for Croatian club Karlovac 1919.

References

External links
 
 

1993 births
Living people
People from Ternopil Oblast
Ukrainian footballers
Association football forwards
FC Dynamo-2 Kyiv players
FC Ternopil players
FC Cherkashchyna players
PFC Sumy players
FC Poltava players
FC Obolon-Brovar Kyiv players
NK Karlovac players
Ukrainian First League players
Ukrainian Second League players
Ukrainian expatriate footballers
Expatriate footballers in Croatia
Ukrainian expatriate sportspeople in Croatia